Vohwinkel Schwebebahn station is the western terminal of the Wuppertal Schwebebahn. It contains the station, a loop for the train to turn around, the depot with a second loop, and the three-storied main works for maintenance and repair.

Vohwinkel Schwebebahn is km zero of the 13.3 km long track to the eastern terminal, Oberbarmen.

During the renovations that took place between 1999 and 2014, the old passenger station was torn down in 2007 and replaced.

Transportation hub
The railway station, Wuppertal-Vohwinkel, that had been initially adjacent was moved about 300 m east and is accessible by foot. Public transportation by bus provides connections to Solingen, Mettman, Haan, Hilden, and Düsseldorf, among others. The Solingen connection is by trolleybus.

References

External links
 
 Collection of old postcards showing the Vohwinkel Station

Wuppertal Schwebebahn
Monorail stations
Railway stations in Wuppertal